Kotulin may refer to:

 Kotulin, Łódź Voivodeship, a village in the administrative district of Gmina Rogów, Poland
 Kotulin, Silesian Voivodeship, a village in the administrative district of Gmina Toszek, Poland
 Kotulin Mały, a village, Poland

See also
 Freddy Kottulinsky (1932–2010), German-Swedish racing and rallying driver